Charles Leonard Todd (June 22, 1871 – September 9, 1932) was an American politician, farmer, and businessman.

Todd was born in Worth County, Iowa. He was the son of Wyvil Boteler Todd and Anna Maria Schiefer. He went to the Lake Mills, Iowa public schools and to the Decorah Academy in Decorah, Iowa. He moved to Wells, Faribault County, Minnesota with his wife and family. Todd was involved with farming and the banking business. Todd served in the Minnesota Senate from 1931 until his death. He died in Wells, Minnesota.

References

1871 births
1932 deaths
People from Worth County, Iowa
People from Wells, Minnesota
Businesspeople from Minnesota
Farmers from Minnesota
Minnesota state senators